Mary Arden's Farm, also known as Mary Arden's House, is the farmhouse of Mary Shakespeare (née Arden), the mother of Elizabethan playwright William Shakespeare. Because of confusion about the actual house inhabited by Mary in the mid-sixteenth century, the term may refer to either of two houses. Both are grade I listed and located in the village of Wilmcote, about three miles from Stratford-upon-Avon.

A house wrongly identified as Mary Arden's (it actually belonged to a neighbour) was bought by the Shakespeare Birthplace Trust in 1930 and refurnished in the Tudor style. This timber-framed house has been maintained in good condition over the centuries.

In 2000, it was discovered that the building preserved as Mary Arden's house had belonged to a friend and neighbour Adam Palmer and the house was renamed Palmer's Farm. The house that had belonged to the Arden family is Glebe Farm, near to Palmer's Farm. A more modest building, it had been acquired by the Shakespeare Birthplace Trust in 1968 for preservation as part of a farmyard without knowing its true provenance.
The building has lost some of its original timber framing and features some Victorian brickwork, but it has been possible to date it through dendrochronology to c.1514.

The houses and farm are presented as a "working Tudor farm". The farm keeps many rare breeds of animals, including Mangalitza and Tamworth pigs, Cotswold sheep, Longhorn cattle, Bagot and Golden Guernsey goats, geese and birds of prey, including a Hooded Vulture.

References

External links
Mary Arden's Farm / Palmer's Farm - Official Website
Mary Arden's actual farmhouse - not Palmer's Farm

Shakespeare Birthplace Trust
Farm museums in England
Historic house museums in Warwickshire
Grade I listed houses
Grade I listed buildings in Warwickshire
Timber framed buildings in Warwickshire